David Garza Pérez (born June 22, 1988) is a Mexican racing driver. He has raced in the A1 Grand Prix and Champ Car Atlantic series.

Career

Karting 
 2005 : 2nd in Shifter 125cc debut season
 2004 : Mexican Rotax Jr. Champion ; Champion in Rotax Jr. of Cam Kart championship ; 12th in the Rotax Grand Nationals in Las Vegas

Formulas 
In 2006 he signed with EuroInternational to race in Formula BMW USA Junior. He finish 9th overall (4th in rookie championship).

He joined the A1 Team Mexico and drove in the A1 Grand Prix series in 2007-08 season.

Career results 

 (1) = Team standings.

External links 
  david-garza.com
 Driver Statistics at results.a1gp.com
 Career statistic driverdb.com

References 

1988 births
Racing drivers from Nuevo León
Sportspeople from Monterrey
Living people
A1 Team Mexico drivers
Atlantic Championship drivers
Formula BMW USA drivers
A1 Grand Prix drivers
Forsythe Racing drivers
EuroInternational drivers
US RaceTronics drivers
Campos Racing drivers